Willie Callaghan (born 9 December 1941) is a Scottish former footballer, who played for East Stirlingshire, Aberdeen, Albion Rovers and Stranraer in the Scottish Football League and Barnsley in the Football League. 

In the summer of 1963, he played in the Eastern Canada Professional Soccer League with Toronto City.

References

1941 births
Living people
Association football wingers
Scottish footballers
East Stirlingshire F.C. players
Aberdeen F.C. players
Dumbarton F.C. players
Barnsley F.C. players
Albion Rovers F.C. players
Stranraer F.C. players
St Roch's F.C. players
Scottish Football League players
English Football League players
Footballers from Glasgow
Toronto City players
Eastern Canada Professional Soccer League players